The 2020–21 Furman Paladins men's basketball team represented Furman University in the 2020–21 NCAA Division I men's basketball season. The Paladins, led by fourth-year head coach Bob Richey, played their home games at Timmons Arena and Bon Secours Wellness Arena in Greenville, South Carolina as members of the Southern Conference.

Previous season
The Paladins finished the 2019–20 season 25–7, 15–3 in SoCon play to finish in second place. They lost in the quarterfinals of the SoCon tournament to Wofford. Although having 25 wins and being a strong candidate for postseason play, all post season tournaments were cancelled amid the COVID-19 pandemic.

Roster

Schedule and results

|-
!colspan=12 style=| Non-conference regular season

|-
!colspan=9 style=| SoCon regular season

|-
!colspan=12 style=| SoCon tournament
|-

|-

Source

References

Furman Paladins men's basketball seasons
Furman Paladins
Furman Paladins men's basketball
Furman Paladins men's basketball